The Cremera is a  Italian stream in Lazio (and previously in Etruria) which runs past Sacrofano, Formello, and Campagnano di Roma before falling into the Tiber about  north of Rome. It connects to the Tiber just as the Via Flaminia intersects the Grande Raccordo Anulare highway, on the proximity of the Labaro Roma Nord railway station, where there is an ancient Roman bridge.
It is famous for the defeat of the three hundred Fabii, who had established a fortified post on its banks.

References

Rivers of the Province of Rome
Rivers of Italy